John Townsend  of Warwick was an English politician who sat in the House of Commons from 1597 to 1614.

Townsend was the son of Richard Townsend of Warwick and his wife Christian. 

He was bailiff of Warwick from 1589 to 1590 and then in 1597 and 1901 elected Member of Parliament for the town. After another period as bailiff in 1603–04 he was re-elected MP for Warwick to the Addled Parliament of 1614. He was finally bailiff again from 1621 to 1622.
 
Townsend died after 1622.

References

Year of birth missing
Year of death missing
16th-century births
17th-century deaths
People from Warwick
English MPs 1597–1598
English MPs 1601
English MPs 1604–1611
English MPs 1614